Charles Arthur Hutchison (born November 17, 1948) is a former American football offensive guard who played six seasons in the National Football League (NFL) with the St. Louis Cardinals and Cleveland Browns. He was drafted by the Cardinals in the second round of the 1970 NFL Draft. He played college football at Ohio State University and attended Carrollton High School in Carrollton, Ohio.

In 1976, Hutchinson had two knee operations within a span of seven months and ended up missing the entire 1976 season. In August 1977, he asked the Browns to waive him and the team did so. Earlier in the week the Browns had also attempted to trade him. He was later offensive line coach for the Toronto Argonauts. He joined the Oakland Invaders in 1982. On March 13, 1984, Invaders head coach John Ralston was fired and Hutchinson was named the team's interim head coach. At the time of his promotion, Hutchinson was serving as the team's offensive line coach and director of player personnel. The Invaders had a 7–8 record under Hutchison.

References

External links
Just Sports Stats

Living people
1948 births
American football offensive guards
Ohio State Buckeyes football players
St. Louis Cardinals (football) players
Cleveland Browns players
Toronto Argonauts coaches
United States Football League coaches
Players of American football from Canton, Ohio
Sportspeople from Canton, Ohio